Mitreni is a commune in Călărași County, Muntenia, Romania. It is composed of three villages: Clătești, Mitreni and Valea Roșie.

References

Mitreni
Localities in Muntenia